The Malaysia Masters, began in 2009, is a badminton tournament at the Super 500 grade, formerly a Grand Prix Gold. The total prize money is now US$350,000, having previously been US$120,000.

BWF categorised Malaysia Masters as one of the seven BWF World Tour Super 500 events in the BWF events structure since 2018.

Host cities

Winners

Performances by nation

References 

 
Badminton tournaments in Malaysia